Colletotrichum derridis is a fungal plant pathogen.

References

External links

derridis
Fungal plant pathogens and diseases
Fungi described in 1950